Elections for the Second Assembly of the Chamber of Counties of the Croatian Parliament were held in Croatia on 13 April 1997. The result was a victory for the Croatian Democratic Union, which won 40 of the 63 elected seats. This was the last election for the Chamber of Counties, which was abolished through a constitutional amendment on 29 March 2001. UNTAES facilitated the conduct of elections in the United Nations protectorate region of Eastern Slavonia, Baranja and Western Syrmia.

Results
President Franjo Tuđman had the constitutional right to appoint up to five members of the Chamber of Counties. He chose to exercise that right by naming Ivan Aralica, Jovan Bamburač, Slobodan Lang, Vojislav Stanimirović and Zlatko Vitez to the chamber.

References

Elections in Croatia
Croatia
1997 elections in Croatia
1997 in Croatia
April 1997 events in Europe